Lewiefield Halt was a wooden-built halt that served the hamlet of Lewie, and a Ministry of Labour training camp, in Northumberland, England.

History
The halt was on the Border Counties Railway which linked the Newcastle and Carlisle Railway, near Hexham, with the Border Union Railway at Riccarton Junction. The first section of the route was opened between Hexham and Chollerford in 1858, the remainder opening in 1862. The line was closed to passengers by British Railways in 1956. Part of the line is now beneath the surface of Kielder Water.

The halt was constructed primarily to serve a Ministry of Labour training camp built on Forestry Commission land nearby. The halt remained busy during the Second World War when the local camp was used to first house conscientious objectors, then refugees. After the war traffic to the halt was limited and it closed in 1956. Only an overgrown platform remains of the halt today.

References

External links
Lewiefield Halt on Disused Stations
Lewiefield Halt on a navigable 1955 O. S. map

Disused railway stations in Northumberland
Former London and North Eastern Railway stations
Railway stations in Great Britain opened in 1933
Railway stations in Great Britain closed in 1956